Tracy Rude (born September 25, 1968) is an American rower. She competed in the women's eight event at the 1992 Summer Olympics.

References

External links
 

1968 births
Living people
American female rowers
Olympic rowers of the United States
Rowers at the 1992 Summer Olympics
Sportspeople from Appleton, Wisconsin
21st-century American women